Neohelvibotys pelotasalis is a moth in the family Crambidae described by Hahn William Capps in 1967. It is found in Rio Grande do Sul, Brazil.

The wingspan is about 18 mm. Adults have been recorded on wing in May.

References

Moths described in 1967
Pyraustinae